The Legion of Doom is a music production team and electronic music group, known for their download-only mashup album Incorporated, remixes, and original music for horror soundtracks.

History
The Legion of Doom consists of Chad Blinman and Trever Keith (of the California punk band Face to Face). Having worked together on many recording and production projects beginning in 1997, the two formed the Legion of Doom in 2004 to undertake a series of specialized creative projects.

In 2005, they served as the producer for Senses Fail's cover of the song "Institutionalized", which was to appear on the soundtrack for Tony Hawk's American Wasteland. 

The first of these projects was Incorporated, a mash-up album featuring mixes of various punk and hardcore bands. The album was completed in 2006, but due to some of the artists unwilling to allow the album to be released, the group recommended downloading the album after it was leaked from sources outside of the group off P2P Networks. The leak was the result of the entire album's MP3 files being left in an unprotected folder on the group's website. On March 6, 2007, the album was released in physical format through the label Illegal Art.

The Legion of Doom has also contributed remixes and original music to film soundtracks such as Underworld: Evolution, Saw II and the Las Vegas TV series. Other projects include the original score and music supervision for independent film Eyes Front and an album of original material (The Legion of Doom vs Triune).

The Legion of Doom regularly use samples of dialog from old films and other esoteric sources in their work.  In some of their songs, a male and a female voice can be heard speaking at certain points. These are the voices of Ken and Winnie from the 1950 film This Charming Couple. On the song "Lolita's Medicine" on the album Incorporated, the male voice is from a 1967 anti-drug PSA called Narcotics: Pit of Despair.

Discography

Albums

Compilation appearances

Other songs

External links

Myspace page
SoundCloud page

References

American electronic music duos
American mashup groups
Male musical duos
Remixers
American male film score composers
Record production duos